The Peabody Trust was founded in 1862 as the Peabody Donation Fund and now brands itself simply as Peabody. It is one of London's oldest and largest housing associations with around 55,000 properties across London and the South East. It is also a community benefit society and urban regeneration agency, a developer with a focus on regeneration, and a provider of an extensive range of community programmes.

History

The Trust was founded in 1862 by London-based American banker George Peabody, who in the 1850s had developed a great affection for London, and determined to make a charitable gift to benefit it. His initial ideas included a system of drinking fountains (comparable to the Metropolitan Drinking Fountain and Cattle Trough Association scheme actually set up by Samuel Gurney and Edward Thomas Wakefield in 1859), or a contribution to the "ragged schools" of the Earl of Shaftesbury. In March 1859, however, he settled on establishing a model dwellings company. Three years later, in a letter to The Times on 26 March 1862, he launched the Peabody Donation Fund, with an initial gift of £150,000. The aim of the organisation, he said, would be to "ameliorate the condition of the poor and needy of this great metropolis, and to promote their comfort and happiness". The paper reported, "We have today to announce an act of beneficence unexampled in its largeness and in the time and manner of the gift". Shortly before his death in 1869, Peabody increased his gift to £500,000.

The Peabody Trust was later constituted by Act of Parliament, stipulating its objectives to work solely within London for the relief of poverty. This was to be expressed through the provision of model dwellings for the capital's poor.

The first block, designed by H. A. Darbishire in a red-brick Jacobethan style, opened in Commercial Street, Spitalfields, on 29 February 1864. It cost £22,000 to build, and contained 57 "dwellings" (i.e. flats) for the poor, nine shops with accommodation for the shopkeepers, and baths and laundry facilities on the upper floor. Water-closets were grouped in pairs by the staircases, with one shared between every two flats. This first block was followed by larger estates in Islington, Poplar, Shadwell, Chelsea, Westminster, Bermondsey, and elsewhere. By 1882 the Trust housed more than 14,600 people in 3,500 dwellings. By 1939 it owned more than 8,000 dwellings.

In its early days, the Trust imposed strict rules to ensure that its tenants were of good moral character. Rents were to be paid weekly and punctually; there was a night-time curfew and a set of moral standards to be adhered to; and the dwellings could not be used for certain trades.

Current mission
Peabody states that in pursuit of its mission it will: "put the most vulnerable first"; "design, build and maintain homes and neighbourhoods which people are proud to live in"; "help people, households and communities to be more resilient"; and "[g]row and use our position of influence to create positive change".

Thamesmead regeneration
Peabody is leading a £1 billion regeneration of Thamesmead, Abbey Wood and Plumstead in South-East London. The Group worked with the Royal Borough of Greenwich and the London Borough of Bexley to successfully bid for Greater London Authority housing zone status, which led to a c£80 million investment.

As well as providing thousands of new homes in the area, Peabody says it will provide firm foundations for Thamesmead's long term, sustainable rejuvenation by investing in existing homes, infrastructure and services to improve the quality of life for existing residents. Going beyond "bricks and mortar", Peabody says its work with partners will enhance employment, enterprise, cultural, social and leisure opportunities for people which is supported by socio-economic outputs locally.

Thamesmead and the surrounding area is a major growth and opportunity area for London. Crossrail opened at nearby Abbey Wood in 2022 and Peabody has said it will capitalise on this, ensuring the right amenities, infrastructure and transport connections are available for the long term sustainability of the area.

Peabody Group
In 2014, Gallions, Trust Thamesmead and Tilfen Land became part of the Peabody Group. The Peabody Group now comprises two housing associations, Peabody and Gallions, and a number of trading companies.

In July 2017, Peabody merged with Family Mosaic housing association under the "Peabody" name.

On 1 April 2022 Catalyst Housing became a subsidiary of Peabody Trust. The intention is to move to full integration by April 2023. Once complete, the new Peabody Group will be responsible for 104,000 homes and around 220,000 customers across London and the home counties.

Funding
Housing associations borrow money to pay for new homes and improvements. In March 2011, Peabody raised £200 million on a corporate bond, at a rate among the best secured by a housing association borrowing in its own name. In 2013 it issued a public bond for £350 million. Peabody funded the launch of RTM FM community radio station based in Thamesmead along with Thamesmead Arts and Culture Office (TACO), That SP Studios, and Sam Skinner.

Family Mosaic

Prior to its merger with Peabody, Family Mosaic was a housing association in the United Kingdom. It had over 25,000 homes housing over 45,000 people and was one of the largest housing providers in London, Essex and the South  East of England. Family Mosaic also provided care and support services to over 8,000 people.

Family Mosaic worked with young people, helping them into work and promoting better health.

In addition to offering specialist housing for people with support needs and social housing for general needs tenants, a third strand of Family Mosaic was its role in assisting people to get onto the property ladder through leasehold shared ownership properties.  In April 2017, Family Mosaic announced that it would be launching a 111 home development for private rental tenants.

Family Mosaic also ran employment training courses and activity groups for its residents. It also offered welfare benefits advice.

Family Mosaic was a member of the G15 group of housing associations in London. In July 2017 Family Mosaic merged with Peabody Trust housing association under the "Peabody" name.

Subsidiaries 
Charlton Triangle Homes – Owned and managed 1,162 homes in the London Borough of Greenwich.
Old Oak Housing Association – Owns and manages 669 homes in the London Borough of Hammersmith and Fulham.

Controversies 
In 2012, Family Mosaic was paid an out of court settlement by Haringey London Borough Council because of the council's failure to pay additional costs of over £108,000 for two care home residents. 
A number of complaints have been made against Family Mosaic in the national and local press, including heating being cut-off for five months of the year, a ceiling collapsing, poor administration at one of its care homes,  and a rodent infestation. In 2014, Family Mosaic took the unusual step of apologising to its tenants after a malfunctioning computer system led to an increase in complaints about its repairs service.

Catalyst Housing 

Catalyst Housing is a housing association operating in London and the south-east of England. On 1 April 2022 Catalyst became a subsidiary of The Peabody Trust. The intention is to move to full integration by April 2023. Once complete, the new Peabody Group will be responsible for 104,000 homes and around 220,000 customers across London and the home counties.

See also
Strawberry Vale Estate
Clays Lane Estate
BedZED
List of existing model dwellings

References

Further reading

External links

External links

 peabody.org.uk, official website

Organizations established in 1862
1862 establishments in the United Kingdom
Housing associations based in England
Housing organisations based in London
Charities based in London
Model dwellings